Code Orange may refer to:

 One of the hospital emergency codes
Code Orange (band), an American hardcore punk band
Code Orange (novel), a 2005 young adult novel by Caroline B. Cooney
Code Orange (political party), a Dutch political movement